Lewis Charles Crofts, (born in Blackburn, UK on 5 November 1977), is an English author and journalist. He studied Modern and Medieval Languages at St Catherine’s College, Oxford University. He has lived in Hanover (Germany), France, Prague (Czech Republic) and Brussels (Belgium), working as a journalist and translator.

His first book, The Pornographer of Vienna, is a novel based on the life of Austrian painter Egon Schiele who was famous for his sexually explicit depictions of the Viennese underworld. It was published in June 2007 by Old Street Publishing in the UK and in July 2008 in North America.

The novel was published in Italy in September 2008 by Marco Tropea under the title Il pornografo di Vienna. Other fiction writing has appeared in the Prague Revue, Notes from the Underground and Ether Magazine. In an interview with 3:AM Magazine, he confirmed work on a second novel.

Crofts is also a correspondent for MLex Market Intelligence, a news agency focusing on competition law and regulatory risk.

Bibliography 
The Pornographer of Vienna  
The Best Day of My Life (story in anthology, ed. Giles Vickers-Jones) 
Madwoman on a Pilgrimage by Johann Wolfgang von Goethe (foreword by L.Crofts, trans. A.Piper)
And So They Came (story in anthology The Return of Kral Majales, ed. Louis Armand)

Articles 
"Exploding the Marat myth" November 2007, The Bulletin
Karl Marx, Das Kapital: erster Band

Reviews 
Guardian review 9 June 2007
Il Venerdì 22 July 2008, Vita, Morte e Segreti del "pornografo" Schiele 
Il Mattino 3 July 2008, Schiele pornografia ed erotismo 
Financial Times review 8 June 2007 "Art of Darkness
La Repubblica 4 September 2008 
Here Is The City

References

External links 
Official Website of Lewis Crofts
Lewis Crofts at MySpace
Author page at Old Street Publishing

British writers
1977 births
Living people